K3 – Kripo Hamburg is a German television series.

See also
List of German television series

External links
 

German crime television series
2003 German television series debuts
2008 German television series endings
Television shows set in Hamburg
German-language television shows
Das Erste original programming
2000s German police procedural television series